John Niel Green,  (born August 10, 1939), is an American cinematographer and film director best known for his Oscar-nominated collaborations with actor/director Clint Eastwood, taking over from Eastwood's previous collaborator Bruce Surtees.

Biography

Early life
Green was born in 1939, in San Francisco, California, to Trudy and John Green, Sr.

His parents were photography enthusiasts. Their home-made darkroom had a strong artistic impact on Green. At age 17, Green graduated from both high school and barber college, expecting to become a career barber.

Early career
A regular barbershop customer, cameraman John Dieves—who had been a combat cameraman in World War II—excited Green with tales of the trade. Green eventually joined Dieves, to work on small television productions, for various production companies, including San Francisco’s W.A. Palmer. In 1965 Dieves sponsored Green's union membership.

In the summer of 1966, Green was assistant cameraman for a documentary, in Oregon, about the movie The Way West. His work was chiefly on aerial shots.

In 1968, Green moved to Hollywood where he began his career as an assistant to Emmy-winning cinematographer Donald M. Morgan. He worked primarily on aerial unit photography, shooting helicopter exteriors for the film Bob & Carol & Ted & Alice. After being laid off, he fell in with Michael W. Watkins, who got him a job as a camera operator on the Jonathan Demme film Fighting Mad. He spent much of the 1970s and early 1980s freelancing as an operator under DPs like William A. Fraker, Ric Waite, Harry Stradling Jr., and Bruce Surtees, shooting films like Bronco Billy, 48 Hrs., Pale Rider, and Beverly Hills Cop.

Clint Eastwood films
He first met Clint Eastwood on the set of the film The Gauntlet, and proceeded to operate on every single Eastwood film until being promoted to DP on Heartbreak Ridge after being recommended by Surtees. Because of Eastwood's tendency to reuse the same crew from film-to-film, Green shot every Eastwood-directed film between 1986 and 2000, their final collaboration being Space Cowboys. Green's work on the 1992 western, Unforgiven earned him nominations for an Academy Award and a BAFTA Award for best cinematography. He was also a nominee for the ASC Award for the 1995 film, The Bridges of Madison County.

Recent career
Since 2000, Green has worked on over fifteen films in genres ranging from science fiction (Serenity) to action (A Man Apart) to comedy (50 First Dates, The 40-Year-Old Virgin, Hot Tub Time Machine). He made his directorial debut with Traveller, a 1997 crime drama starring Bill Paxton and Mark Wahlberg. Green has been a member of the American Society of Cinematographers (ASC) since 1992.

Filmography 

Assistant Camera

Camera Operator

2nd Unit Director of Photography

Additional Photography

Awards and nominations 
 1988 Cannes Film Festival Grand Prix Award for Technical Excellence: Bird (won)
 1992 Academy Award for Best Cinematography: Unforgiven (nominated)
 1992 BAFTA Award for Best Cinematography: Unforgiven (nominated)
 1992 Boston Society of Film Critics Award for Best Cinematography: Unforgiven (won)
 1992 Los Angeles Film Critics Association Award for Best Cinematography: Unforgiven (won)
 1992 Dallas–Fort Worth Film Critics Association Award for Best Cinematography: Unforgiven (won)
 1992 National Society of Film Critics Award for Best Cinematography: Unforgiven (won)
 1995 ASC Award for Outstanding Achievement in Cinematography in Theatrical Releases: The Bridges of Madison County (nomination)
 1998 Society of Camera Operators President's Award (won)
 2003 Big Bear Lake International Film Festival Lifetime Achievement Award (won)
 2009 ASC Lifetime Achievement Award (won)

References

External links
 

1946 births
American cinematographers
Living people
People from San Francisco